"Out the Box" may refer to:

Out the Box (Tonéx album), an album by Tonéx
Out the Box (Jean album), an album by Jean
" Out The Box"  Out The Box online travel presenter